Pulaski is an unincorporated rural village located in Pulaski County, in the U.S. state of Indiana.

History
Pulaski was laid out in 1855 soon after a gristmill has been built at that point. The community took its name from Pulaski County. A post office was established at Pulaski in 1852, and remained in operation until it was discontinued in 1927.  Pulaski is also the site of a highschool, and is part of the Indian Creek Township.

Geography

References

Unincorporated communities in Pulaski County, Indiana
Unincorporated communities in Indiana